Steve Wynn is an entrepreneur.

Steve Wynn may also refer to:

 Steve Wynn (musician) (born 1960), American singer and songwriter

See also
 Steve Winn (born 1977), Welsh rugby union player
 Steve Winn (footballer) (born 1959), English association football forward